Suntinorexton is an experimental orexin receptor agonist. It acts as a selective agonist of the orexin OX2 receptor and was described in 2019 in a patent by Takeda Pharmaceutical Company.

See also
 Orexin receptor § Agonists
 List of investigational sleep drugs § Orexin receptor agonists

References

Alcohols
Experimental drugs
Fluoroarenes
Orexin receptor agonists
Pyrrolidines
Sulfonamides